Wenxian Shen is a Chinese-American mathematician known for her work in topological dynamics, almost-periodicity, waves and other spatial patterns in dynamical systems. She is a professor of mathematics at Auburn University.

Education
Shen graduated from Zhejiang Normal University in 1982, and earned a master's degree at Peking University in 1987. She completed a Ph.D. in mathematics at the Georgia Institute of Technology in 1992, with the dissertation Stability and Bifurcation of Traveling Wave Solutions supervised by Shui-Nee Chow.

Book
Shen is the coauthor of two monographs, Almost Automorphic and Almost Periodic Dynamics in Skew-Product Semiflows (with Yingfei Yi, American Mathematical Society, 1998), and Spectral Theory for Random and Nonautonomous Parabolic Equations and Applications (with Janusz Mierczyński, CRC Press, 2008).

References

External links

Year of birth missing (living people)
Living people
20th-century American mathematicians
21st-century American mathematicians
American women mathematicians
Chinese mathematicians
Chinese women mathematicians
Dynamical systems theorists
Zhejiang Normal University alumni
Peking University alumni
Georgia Tech alumni
Auburn University faculty
20th-century American women
21st-century American women